Margaret June Blair (October 20, 1932 – December 4, 2022) was an American model and actress. She was best known for being Playboy magazine's Playmate of the Month for its January 1957 issue and for being part of the TV series The Adventures of Ozzie and Harriet
as the wife of her real-life husband David Nelson.

Acting career
Blair made her first television appearance in 1954. Through the rest of the decade, she took supporting roles in feature films and guest-starred in series television, including two episodes, "Performance Under Fire" and "The Dead Ringer" of the 1960-61 syndicated western series Two Faces West.

Personal life and death
Blair was engaged to the singer Nino Tempo in 1957. The next year she broke off her engagement with Tempo and started dating Lindsay Crosby. On May 21, 1961, Blair married David Nelson and joined the cast of The Adventures of Ozzie and Harriet.  Ricky Nelson was the best man. She had two sons with David, born 1962 and 1966; they divorced in 1975. David Nelson died on January 11, 2011.

Blair died in Sherman Oaks, California, on December 4, 2022, at the age of 90.

Filmography
 Our Miss Brooks (1956) (uncredited) .... Miss Lonelyhearts
 Conflict - "The Money" (1957) .... Blonde
 This Could Be the Night (1957) (uncredited) .... Chorus Girl
 Man of a Thousand Faces (1957) (uncredited) .... Chorine
 Bachelor Father - "Bentley Versus the Girl Scouts" (1957)
 Hell Bound (1957) .... Paula
 The Fiend Who Walked the West (1958)
 Lone Texan (1959) .... Florrie Stuart
 Island of Lost Women (1959) .... Mercuria
 Warlock (1959) (uncredited) .... Dance hall girl
 The Rabbit Trap (1959) .... Judy Colt
 The Best of Everything (1959) .... Brenda
 Bat Masterson
 "Dead Men Don't Pay Debts" (1959) 
 "Death by Decree" (1960) .... Constance Whitney
 Hawaiian Eye - "Three Tickets to Lani" (1959) .... Anita Callahan
 Lock-Up
 "Music to Murder By" (1959)
 "Court Martial" (1961)
 The Texan - "Town Divided" (1960) .... Ellen Warren
 Tombstone Territory (1960) "Revenge" ..... Lady Bell
 Sea Hunt
 "Water Nymphs" (Season 3, Episode 2 1960)
 "Cross Current" (1960)
 M Squad - "The Bad Apple" (1960) .... Patty Conway
 The Chevy Mystery Show - "The Inspector Vanishes" (1960) .... Colette Dufour
 A Fever in the Blood (1961) .... Paula Thornwall
 The Aquanauts - "The Defective Tank Adventure" (1961) .... June Noreen
 The Adventures of Ozzie & Harriet (1961–1966) .... June

See also
 List of people in Playboy 1953–1959

References

External links
 
 
 Glamour Girls of the Silver Screen

1932 births
2022 deaths
Actresses from San Francisco
Female models from California
1950s Playboy Playmates